The Derby Lorrain is a football match contested between French clubs Metz and Nancy. The name of the derby derives from the fact that Metz and Nancy are the two major clubs in France that are located in the former region of Lorraine.

External links
  Metz Official Site
  Nancy Official Site

French football derbies
AS Nancy Lorraine
FC Metz
Football in Grand Est
1970 establishments in France
Recurring sporting events established in 1970